Jerzy Wilibald Krasówka (17 August 1924 – 11 April 2001) was a Polish footballer who competed in the 1952 Summer Olympics.

References

1924 births
2001 deaths
Association football forwards
Polish footballers
Olympic footballers of Poland
Footballers at the 1952 Summer Olympics
Poland international footballers
Sportspeople from Gliwice
Szombierki Bytom players